Ministry of Law, Justice and Parliamentary Affairs (Ā'ina, bicāra ō sansada biṣaẏaka mantraṇālaẏa) is a ministry of the government of the People's Republic of Bangladesh which deals with the management of the legal affairs, legislative activities, handles affairs relating to the Parliament of Bangladesh and administration of justice in Bangladesh through its two divisions: Law and Justice Division and the Legislative and Parliamentary Affairs Division respectively.

History 
Ministry of Law, Justice and Parliamentary Affairs was established in 1972.

List of ministers
The Ministers in the Ministry of Law, Justice and Parliamentary Affairs are as follows:
Kamal Hossain (1972-1973)
Monoranjan Dhar (1973-1975)
Abu Sadat Mohammad Sayeem (1975-1977)
Abdus Sattar (1977-1981)
 TH Khan (1981-1982)
Shah Mohammad Azizur Rahman (1982)
 Khondokar Abubakar (1982-1984)
 Ataur Rahman (1984-1985)
 AR Yusuf (19 January 1985 - 17 February 1985)
AKM Nurul Islam (1985-1989)
Moudud Ahmed (1989-1990)
Habibul Islam Bhuiyan (1990)
Md. Abdul Khaleq (1990-1991)
Mirza Golam Hafiz (1991-1996)
Muhammad Jamiruddin Sircar (1996)
Syed Istiaq Ahmed (1996)
Abdul Matin Khasru (1997-2001)
Syed Istiaq Ahmed (2001)
Moudud Ahmed (2001-2006)
Md. Fazlul Haque (2006-2007)
Mainul Husein (2007-2008)
A F Hasan Arif (2008-2009)
 Shafique Ahmed (2009-2014)
 Anisul Huq (2014–present)

Directorates

Law and Justice Division
 Bangladesh Supreme Court
 Bangladesh Law Commission
 Bangladesh Judicial Service Commission
 National Legal Aid Agency
 Directorate of Registration

Legislative and Parliamentary Affairs Division
 Bangladesh Law Commission
 Bangladesh National Human Rights Commission
 The Attorney General's Office

See also
 Justice ministry
 Politics of Bangladesh

References

 
Law, Justice and Parliamentary Affairs
Ministries established in 1972
1972 establishments in Bangladesh
Parliamentary affairs ministries